The 2012 VFF Cup was the 9th edition of the annual football tournament organised by the Vietnam Football Federation (VFF) and took place on 24–28 October 2012.

Venue

Squads

Results

Goalscorers 
2 goals
  Nguyễn Quang Hải

1 goal

  Cho In-hyeong
  Gong Min-hyun
  Han Seung-yeop
  Kim Bong-rae
  Kim Pyeong-jin
  Lee Jung-kwon
  Park Ji-hoon
  Park Jung-bin
  Yang Se-yoon
  Keoviengphet Liththideth
  Phatthana Syvilay
  Sopha Saysana
  Akmyrat Jumanazarow
  Aleksandr Boliýan
  Guwanç Abylow
  Süleyman Muhadow
  Wladimir Baýramow
  Huỳnh Quốc Anh
  Nguyễn Trọng Hoàng
  Nguyễn Văn Quyết

References

External links 
 Official website

VFF Cup
V
VFF